Abu Abdallah Mohammed II,  Al-Mutawakkil, often simply Abdallah Mohammed (died 4 August 1578) was a Sultan of Morocco from  1574 to 1576. He was the oldest son of Abdallah al-Ghalib and became Sultan after his father's death.

Life 
Immediately after his accession to the throne, he had one of his brothers executed and another (Mulay en-Naser, the governor of Tadla) imprisoned.

Abu Abdallah's uncle, Abd al-Malik, who, like his father Abdallah al-Ghalib, was a son of Mohammed ash-Sheikh, had fled to Constantinople in the Ottoman Empire in 1574. Meanwhile in Ottoman Algeria, Abd al-Malik succeeded in organising his own army, consisting of Ottoman soldiers, and in 1576 he invaded Morocco and conquered Fez from his nephew. The two sides fought a battle at al-Rukn in the lands of Banu waritin, near Fez and then fought again near Salé (Rabat) in Jandaq al-Rayhan.  Each time Abd al-Malik defeated his nephew. A third battle, also won by Abd al-Malik, took place in Taroudannt.

Both Abd al-Malik and Abu Abdallah died two years later during the Battle of Alcácer Quibir, in 1578. In that battle, Abu Abdallah fought against his uncle Abd al-Malik with the help of his Portuguese allies.

See also
 List of rulers of Morocco
 History of Morocco
 Saadi dynasty

Notes

Year of birth unknown
1578 deaths
Sultans of Morocco
Saadi dynasty
People from Marrakesh
Moroccan military personnel killed in action
16th-century Moroccan people
16th-century monarchs in Africa
16th-century Arabs